Double-Cola is the name of a carbonated soft drink. It is manufactured by The Double Cola Company, headquartered in Chattanooga, Tennessee.

Double-Cola is considered a regionally manufactured US brand of soft drink, predominantly distributed east of the Mississippi River. It is also available in select international markets.

History

The Good Grape Company was founded in 1922 by former Chero-Cola employees Charles D. Little and Joe S. Foster in Huntsville, Alabama, primarily  to market the product Good Grape. The company moved to Chattanooga that same year.  With Little's creation of Marvel Cola in 1924, Good Grape Company changed its name to Seminole Flavor Company. Marvel Cola was reformulated and renamed Jumbo Cola. The Double-Cola product was developed in 1933 and soon became the company's flagship product. The product was named Double-Cola because its 12-ounce (350 ml) bottles were twice the size of other soda bottles being sold at the time. It was soon followed by flavored Double-Orange, Double-Lemon, and Double-Grape and "Double-Dry" ginger ale.

During World War II's sugar rationing, Seminole continued bottling Double-Cola in the larger bottles, which hurt production. PepsiCo was in the same position, and Little had a chance to buy them and refused as he preferred just going forward with the cola Seminole had.  Pepsi escaped bankruptcy and moved ahead of Seminole. In 1953 Seminole changed its name to The Double Cola Company as it is today though for a period known as the Double-Cola Co. USA.

In 1956, the company developed Ski, a soda pop comparable to Sun Drop. Ski is a citrus soda made with real orange and real lemon juice. The drink received its name when company asked employees to submit a name for their new product. Inspired by a weekend-long ski trip on Chickamauga Lake, then-employee Dot Myers submitted the names "Ski" and "Skee" into the contest. Management liked the name and it's been Ski ever since.

In 1957 Double-Cola made history by becoming the first major soft drink to be marketed in a 16-ounce (470 ml) returnable bottle. In 1962, the year Diet Double Cola was launched, Little sold the company to Fairmont Foods, which drained the company of resources. It was purchased in 1980 by K.J. International, Inc., from Canadian firm Pop Shops International, which acquired it from a consortium of private investors. It remains wholly privately held. Pop Shops had allowed the company to flounder as they focused on their existing brands.

In summer of 1960, Double Cola used a Chinese name as "(得寶可樂)", a locally made super king size with much more carbon dioxide for only 40 Hong Kong cents for a 16-ounce bottle which could serve three then-typical beverage cups.

Since 2010
In 2010 Diet Double-Cola was reformulated with Splenda to make it taste more like regular Double-Cola. Two years later the Double Cola was given new branding and packaging though the ingredients stayed exactly the same.

In 2013 The Double Cola Company expanded its product line outside of that of just soft drinks. Quad Energy was released in 2012 in five different flavors all with energy-boosting ingredients. The same year The Double Cola Company tapped into the ever-growing coconut water market with MINŌKU Coconut Water. MINŌKU Coconut Water is ethically sourced in Thailand and is sold nationally in the US.

The Double Cola Company has plans to release their newest product ZILI Tea in the near future in five different flavors. The Double Cola Company website says, "ZILI Teas are all natural teas that harness the power of Mother Nature to hydrate, nourish, and satisfy."

Marketing
Double Cola was formerly available in a somewhat wider area of the South. Yet Double Cola is a distinctive part of culture in Southern Indiana, especially around Evansville (for example, Double Cola Fields). It was once marketed as a lower-cost alternative to Coca-Cola and other soft drinks, but Double Cola is now marketed as a premium brand in that area, with the same or higher price than Coca-Cola or Pepsi-Cola. Diet versions of both Double Cola and Ski have been developed in recent years. The "Jumbo" line of fruit-flavored drinks has been expanded to include peach, strawberry, pineapple, fruit punch, root beer, and blue creme soda. Some of these drinks are available only in very limited areas.
  
Speculation that expansion to Middle Eastern markets was at least in part a chance to exploit the company's low profile and consequent lack of political connotations now inherent in the Coke–Pepsi struggle. Though the Double Cola company's international sales are not as large as Coke or Pepsi, their presence in South Asia, South America and the Middle East comprises their international market. Double-Cola, Oranta and Chaser are the main products sold in their foreign markets.

Popular culture about The Double Cola Company

Double-Cola is sold in the classic glass bottles at Cracker Barrel stores. 
Ski is mentioned in the song "Dumas Walker" by The Kentucky Headhunters.
Double-Cola is mentioned in the song "Nesbitt's Lime Soda Song" by Negativland.
A sign promoting Ski can be seen on the door of the Whistlestop Cafe in the movie Fried Green Tomatoes.
Ski is a sponsor of the MB Motorsports, the sole surviving original NASCAR Camping World Truck Series team.
Quad Energy was in an episode of the TV series Parks and Recreation during the fall of 2013. 
Signage can also be seen on the station porch in the 2012 movie "Lawless".

References

External links
Official website

Products introduced in 1922
Companies based in Chattanooga, Tennessee
American cola brands